Oregon Trail is a 1981 board game published by Fantasy Games Unlimited.

Gameplay
Oregon Trail is a game that attempts to recreate the journeys across the continent in covered wagons along the Oregon Trail.

Reception
David Ladyman reviewed Oregon Trail in The Space Gamer No. 47. Ladyman commented that "Oregon Trail can't really be cited for historical accuracy because you don't know what parts are accurate and what have been dramatized.  In sum, a nice try, but I can't think of a good reason to buy the game."

Reviews
 1981 Games 100 in Games
1982 Games 100 in Games
Moves #60, p22

References

Board games introduced in 1981
Fantasy Games Unlimited games